West Bengali or Central Bengali, simply known as Rāṛhī Bengali, is the dialect of Bengali language spoken in the southeastern part of West Bengal, in and around the Bhagirathi River basin of Nadia district and the Presidency division in West Bengal, as well as the Greater Kushtia region of western Bangladesh. It forms the basis of the standard variety of Bengali.

Geographical boundaries

This dialect is prevalent in the West Bengali districts of Kolkata, North 24 Parganas, South 24 Parganas, Nadia, Howrah,  Hooghly and Purba Bardhaman. It is also spoken natively in the Chuadanga, Kushtia and Meherpur districts of Bangladesh, which were a part of the Nadia district prior to the 1947 Partition of India. Along with Eastern Bengali dialect, Modern Standard Bengali has been formed on the basis of this dialect.

Features
Extensive use of Obhishruti (অভিশ্রুতি, /obʱisrut̪i/, umlaut). E.g. old Bengali Koriya (করিয়া, /koria/, meaning - having done) > Beng. Koira (কইর‍্যা, /koirya/) > Beng. Kore (করে, /kore/).

 The change of অ to ও, when অ is the first sound of a word where the অ is followed by ই(ি), ও(ো), ক্ষ or য. E.g. Ati (written অতি, means 'excess') is pronounced as Oti (ওতি, /ot̪i/).
 Use of vowel harmony. E.g. Bilati (বিলাতি, /bilat̪i/, meaning - foreign) became Biliti (বিলিতি, /biliti/).

Obhishruti and Opinihiti

Ôpinihiti (অপিনিহিতি, /opinihit̪i/, epenthesis) and Ôbhishruti (অভিশ্রুতি, /obʱisrut̪i/) are two phonological phenomena that occur in spoken Bengali (Bangla). Opinihiti is used in Bangali (Vanga) dialect and Obhishruti is used in Rarhi (Radha) dialect. Opinihiti refers to the phonological process in which a ই or উ is pronounced before it occurs in the word. Obhishruti is the sound change in which this shifted ই or উ becomes removed and changes the preceding vowel. Observe the example above : Choliya (চলিয়া, /choliya/) > Choilya (চইল্যা, /choilya/) > Chole (চলে, /chole/). First Opinihiti changes 'Choliya' to 'Choilya' (notice how the I changes position.), then Obhishruti changes 'Choilya' to 'Chole'. Example :- Sadhu (Classical/Pure) Bengali (Bangla): Ram 'choliya' gelo (রাম চলিয়া গেল), Bangali (Vanga/Impure): Ram 'choilya' gelo (রাম চইল্যা গেল), Rarhi (Radha/Chalit/Impure): Ram 'chole' gelo (রাম চলে গেল).

References 

Eastern Indo-Aryan languages
Bengali dialects
Languages of West Bengal
Languages of Bangladesh